The Falkland Islands general election of 1949 was held in February 1949 to elect members to the Legislative Council through universal suffrage. It was the first election in the history of the Falkland Islands, electing four out of the twelve Councillors (two from Stanley and one each from East Falkland and West Falkland). Owing to the remoteness of some settlements and the unpredictability of the weather on the Falkland Islands, the election took place over several days.

The Legislative Council of the Falkland Islands was founded on 13 November 1845, with its entire membership being appointed by the Governor. On 26 November 1948, in a meeting of the Privy Council, King George VI approved Legislative Council (Elections) Ordinance No. 16 of 1948 which introduced elections to the Falklands for the first time, giving four seats of the Legislative Council to elected members.

Results

References

1949 elections in South America
General election
1949
February 1949 events in South America
Non-partisan elections
1949 elections in the British Empire